Virgil Finlay is a memorial collection of drawings by and appreciations of Virgil Finlay. It was compiled and edited by Donald M. Grant and published in 1971  by Donald M. Grant, Publisher, Inc. in an edition of 1,202 copies.

Contents

 Introduction, by Donald M. Grant
 Selected Illustrations, by Virgil Finlay
 "Virgil Finlay", by Sam Moskowitz
 "A Virgil Finlay Checklist", by Gerry de la Ree
 An Index to "A Virgil Finlay Checklist"

References

1971 non-fiction books
Books about visual art
Donald M. Grant, Publisher books